Anka Drinić (11 March 1924 – 2008) was a Yugoslav gymnast. She competed in seven events at the 1952 Summer Olympics.

References

External links
 

1924 births
2008 deaths
Yugoslav female artistic gymnasts
Olympic gymnasts of Yugoslavia
Gymnasts at the 1952 Summer Olympics
Place of birth missing